Gerald Edward Meerschaert III (born December 18, 1987) is an American mixed martial artist currently competing in the Middleweight division of the Ultimate Fighting Championship. A professional competitor since 2007, he formerly competed for the RFA, Titan FC, and King of the Cage. He is a former RFA Middleweight Champion.

Background
Meerschaert was born in Racine, Wisconsin, United States. He trained in Taekwondo when he was young. He began playing alto saxophone in the fifth grade and through his years at Walden III Middle and High School. Meerschaert later studied music education in college, hoping to become a music teacher, before deciding to make MMA his career after watching some local MMA and UFC fights on TV. Meerschaert began training in MMA at the age of 19.

Mixed martial arts career

Early career
After a 1–0 amateur career, Meerschaert fought most of his fights in his native state of Wisconsin, from 2007 to 2011. He started traveling to nearby states to compete after 2012. Prior to joining the UFC, he was an active fighter with a record of 25–8.

Meerschaert began his professional MMA career in March 2007, fighting at Freestyle Combat Challenge 26 on March 10, after just one month of training. He lost his first fight to Jay Ellis via a technical submission. Two months after his first loss, he bounced back to snap a win via kimura. His third MMA fight came one week later on May 19, 2007, against Will Pace. He won the fight via rear-naked choke in round one.

On January 12, 2008, Meerschaert faced Kenneth Allen and won via triangle choke in round one. Five weeks later, Meerschaert stepped in the cage and competed against Caleb Krull. He won the fight via unanimous decision (29–28, 29–28, 29–27). Meerschaert was back to the cage again four weeks later vs. Alex Carter. Meerschaert won the fight via triangle choke in round two. His last fight in Freestyle Combat was on May 3, 2008, vs. Ryan Scheeper. Meerschaert won via armbar in the first round.

Meerschaert fought Mike Vaughn July 25th, 2008. Meerschaert won via first round rear-naked choke. 

Meerschaert fought Curtis Bailey October 10th, 2008. The fight was held in Madison, Wisconsin on Madtown Throwdown 17. The fight was five rounds, and Meerschaert lost the fight via guillotine choke in round two.

After a busy year in 2009, Meerschaert did not set foot on the cage to compete until May 2, 2009. He fought Kenny Robertson on Madtown Throwdown 19 and lost via a kneebar submission on round one.

He started off by fighting on Gladiators Cage Fighting: Fair Warning on August 15, 2009, his opponent was Jacob Kuester and Meerschaert managed to overpower Kuester and submitted him via a neck crank. On the next fight, Meerschaert face-off Morrison Lamb on Racine Fight Night 5 on November 28, 2009, in his hometown, Racine, Wisconsin. It was a short fight where Meerschaert submitted Lamb via a guillotine choke on round one.

Meerschaert faced Eddie Larrea at Extreme Cagefigting Organisation 4 on March 20, 2010. Meerschaert secured the win via an arm-triangle choke. April 17, 2010, Meerschaert fought in Combat USA 19. Meerschaert punched his way through and knocked out Jim Klimczyk and snatched the win.

His last competition in 2010 was on September 11. He took on Sam Alvey, with a record of 11–1–0, ranking number 1 in Wisconsin in the middleweight division. They competed on Combat USA: Championship Tournament Finals for a five-round title middleweight fight.  On the early rounds, Meerschaert attempted multiple takedowns but Alvey managed to stop most of them; however, Meerschaert managed to put Alvey on a guillotine choke on round 5 and secured the win to reign Wisconsin State middleweight 2010 champion.

With the record of 14–4–0, Meerschaert started off his 2011 competition on January 6, facing Dallas O'Malley on Combat USA 24. He won the fight via guillotine choke on round two.

The next fight came 3 months later where Meerschaert took on Herbert Goodman, the former Green Bay Packers football player, defending his Wisconsin Middleweight title on Combat USA: Wisconsin State Finals. Meerscheart lost the fight via a rear-naked choke on round one when he was taken down by Goodman after failing to hit Goodman with his left overhand, giving his back to Goodman where Goodman managed to sink a rear-naked choke.

Six months later, Meerschaert went on to join the Rogue Warrior Championship 3 competition on the welterweight fight on September 6, 2011.  He faced Eddie Larrea and won the fight via a rear-naked choke on round one.

Meerschaert did not return to the cage after he lost to Goodman until about one the half-year later when he went on to join the Rogue Warrior Championship 3 competition on the welterweight fight on September 6, 2011.  He faced Eddie Larrea and won the fight via a rear-naked choke on round one. The second and also the last fight Meerschaert take on for 2012 was on October 19. He was up against Sergej Juskevic at Score Fighting Series. He lost the fight on round two via kneebar submission.

On January 19, 2013, he took on Anthony Lapsley on a catchweight bout (175 Ib) on Rocktagon MMA Elite Series 23. He lost the fight on round one via rear-naked choke. He next faced Jay Ellis on King of the Cage: Certified on April 20, 2013, a catchweight bout (180 Ib). He bounced back from the last two defeat and captured the win with TKO (punches) in round one. Meerschaert went to Duluth, Georgia, to compete on National Fighting Championships 58 on July 19, 2013.  The fight was a 180 Ib catchweight  bout. The judges awarded him with the win after three battle against George Lockhart.  On September 13, 2013, Meerschaert fought with Nathan Gunn in another catchweight fight. He managed to submit Gunn on round two with a guillotine choke on Canadian Fighting Championship 8 event.

Meerschaert moved up to Middleweight (185 Ibs) in 2014 and competed in North American Fighting Championship in two fights. First, he faced Eddie Larrea which he secured a win via arm-triangle choke and moved on to fight Sam Alvey on their second meet up and this time he lost by unanimous decision on judges' scorecards.  His last fight in 2014 was in September where he fought in KOTC: Magnum Force against Matt Lagou. He came out with a win via a TKO (doctor stoppage).

Meerschaert aced Keith Smetana at 4BC: Capital City Punishment in June 2015. He won a quick win via TKO in round one. His next and last fight in 2015  came one month later and won via another TKO (doctor stoppage) against Lucas Rota.

Meerschaert started his first fight in 2016 by moving up to Light Heavyweight division (205 Ibs). He fought at Valor Fight 36 and his opponent was Sidney Wheeler. He threatened Wheeler with a kimura and forced him to tap out on round one. His last fight before joining UFC was in October 2016, facing Chase Waldon in Resurrection Fighting Alliance (RFA) in Middleweight bout. He earned the victory via submission (arm-triangle choke) on round one, earning him the RFA middleweight title.

Ultimate Fighting Championship
Meerschaert made his promotional debut on December 9, 2016, at UFC Fight Night: Lewis vs. Abdurakhimov, replacing injured Oluwale Bamgbose, against Joe Gigliotti. He won the fight via anaconda choke submission in round one. His performance earned him a Performance of the Night bonus award.

Meerschaert faced Ryan Janes on February 19, 2017, at UFC Fight Night: Lewis vs. Browne. He won the fight via submission in the first round.

Meerschaert faced Thiago Santos on July 8, 2017, at UFC 213. He lost the fight via TKO in the second round.

Meerschaert fought Eric Spicely on December 1, 2017, at The Ultimate Fighter 26 Finale. He won the bout via TKO in the second round. This win earned him a Performance of the Night bonus.

Meerschaert faced Oskar Piechota on July 6, 2018, at The Ultimate Fighter 27 Finale. He won the fight via technical submission due to a rear-naked choke in the second round.

Meerschaert faced Jack Hermansson on December 15, 2018, at UFC on Fox 31. He lost the fight via guillotine choke submission in the first round.

Meerschaert faced Kevin Holland on March 30, 2019, at UFC on ESPN 2. He lost the fight via split decision.

Meerschaert faced Trevin Giles on August 3, 2019, at UFC on ESPN 5. He won the fight via technical submission in the third round due to a guillotine choke.

Meerschaert faced Eryk Anders on October 12, 2019, at UFC Fight Night 161. He lost the fight by split decision.

Meerschaert faced Deron Winn on March 7, 2020, at UFC 248. He won the fight via a rear-naked choke submission in the third round.

Meerschaert was scheduled to face Ian Heinisch on June 6, 2020, at UFC 250, however, two days before the fight Heinisch's cornerman tested positive for COVID-19. Heinisch was pulled from the fight and replaced by promotional newcomer Anthony Ivy. Subsequently, the cornerman in question was re-tested and the initial test was proven to be false positive and Heinisch was reinstated to the card. Finally, Meerschaert faced Heinisch as originally scheduled and lost the fight via TKO in the first round.

Meerschaert was expected to face Ed Herman in a light heavyweight bout on August 1, 2020, at UFC Fight Night: Brunson vs. Shahbazyan. On the day of the event, Meerschaert pulled out due to testing positive for COVID-19 and his bout against Herman was cancelled. The bout was rescheduled for September 12, 2020, at UFC Fight Night 177. However, Meerschaert again withdrew from the bout for undisclosed reason and he was replaced by John Allan.

Meerschaert faced Khamzat Chimaev on September 19, 2020, at UFC Fight Night: Covington vs. Woodley. He lost the fight via knockout 17 seconds into round one.

Meerschaert faced Bartosz Fabiński on April 17, 2021, at UFC on ESPN 22. He won the fight via technical submission in round one. This fight earned him the Performance of the Night award.

Meerschaert faced Makhmud Muradov on August 28, 2021, at UFC on ESPN 30. After a back-and-forth fight, he won the fight via rear-naked choke submission in round two. This win earned him the Performance of the Night award.

Meerschaert was scheduled to face Abusupiyan Magomedov on December 18, 2021, at UFC Fight Night 199. However, Magomedov was forced to pull from the event due to visa issue and he was replaced by Dustin Stoltzfus. He won the bout via rear-naked choke in the third round.

Meerschaert faced Krzysztof Jotko on April 30, 2022, at UFC on ESPN 35. He lost the bout via unanimous decision.

Meerschaert faced Bruno Silva on August 13, 2022, at UFC on ESPN 41 He won the fight via a guillotine choke in round three.

Meerschaert was scheduled again to face Abusupiyan Magomedov on February 18, 2023 at UFC Fight Night 219. The fight was cancelled, again due to Magomedov having visa issues.

Meerschaert is scheduled to face Joe Pyfer on April 8, 2023 at UFC 287.

Personal life
The moniker "The Machine" was coined by his friends after seeing him constantly pushing himself in the gym without really taking any breaks.

Meerschaert is an alto saxophone player. Meerschaert is married to Kerrielle Meerschaert who is a medical device representative. The pair have a child named Bronx.

Championships and accomplishments
 Ultimate Fighting Championship
 Performance of the Night (Four times) 
Most submission wins in UFC Middleweight division history (9)
Second most finishes in UFC Middleweight division history (10)
Highest finishes-per-win percentage in UFC history (10 finishes / 10 wins - 100%) (Minimum 10 UFC wins)
Second highest submissions-per-win percentage in UFC history (9 submissions / 10 wins - 90%)
Resurrection Fighting Alliance (RFA)
 Middleweight Champion (One time) vs. Chase Waldon
 Combat USA Championship  
 Wisconsin State Middleweight Champion (One time) vs. Sam Alvey

Mixed martial arts record 

|-
|Win
|align=center|35–15
|Bruno Silva
|Submission (guillotine choke)
|UFC on ESPN: Vera vs. Cruz
|
|align=center|3
|align=center|1:39
|San Diego, California, United States
|
|-
|Loss
|align=center|34–15
|Krzysztof Jotko
|Decision (unanimous)
|UFC on ESPN: Font vs. Vera
|
|align=center|3
|align=center|5:00
|Las Vegas, Nevada, United States
|
|-
|Win
|align=center|34–14
|Dustin Stoltzfus
|Submission (rear-naked choke)
|UFC Fight Night: Lewis vs. Daukaus
|
|align=center|3
|align=center|2:59
|Las Vegas, Nevada, United States
|
|-
|Win
|align=center|33–14
|Makhmud Muradov
|Submission (rear-naked choke)
|UFC on ESPN: Barboza vs. Chikadze
|
|align=center|2
|align=center|1:49
|Las Vegas, Nevada, United States
|
|-
|Win
|align=center|32–14
|Bartosz Fabiński
|Technical Submission (guillotine choke)
|UFC on ESPN: Whittaker vs. Gastelum
|
|align=center|1
|align=center|2:00
|Las Vegas, Nevada, United States
|
|-
|Loss
|align=center|31–14
|Khamzat Chimaev
|KO (punch)
|UFC Fight Night: Covington vs. Woodley
|
|align=center|1
|align=center|0:17
|Las Vegas, Nevada, United States
|
|-
|Loss
|align=center|31–13
|Ian Heinisch
|TKO (punches)
|UFC 250
|
|align=center| 1
|align=center| 1:14
|Las Vegas, Nevada, United States
|
|- 
|Win
|align=center|31–12
|Deron Winn
|Submission (rear-naked choke) 
|UFC 248
|
|align=center|3
|align=center|2:14
|Las Vegas, Nevada, United States
|
|-
|Loss
|align=center|30–12
|Eryk Anders
|Decision (split)
|UFC Fight Night: Joanna vs. Waterson
|
|align=center|3
|align=center|5:00
|Tampa, Florida, United States
|
|-
|Win
|align=center|30–11
|Trevin Giles
|Technical Submission (guillotine choke)
|UFC on ESPN: Covington vs. Lawler
|
|align=center|3
|align=center|1:49
|Newark, New Jersey, United States
|
|-
|Loss
|align=center|29–11
|Kevin Holland
|Decision (split)
|UFC on ESPN: Barboza vs. Gaethje
|
|align=center|3
|align=center|5:00
|Philadelphia, Pennsylvania, United States
|
|-
|Loss
|align=center|29–10
|Jack Hermansson
|Submission (guillotine choke)
|UFC on Fox: Lee vs. Iaquinta 2
|
|align=center|1
|align=center|4:25
|Milwaukee, Wisconsin, United States
|
|-
|Win
|align=center|29–9
|Oskar Piechota
|Technical Submission (rear-naked choke)
|The Ultimate Fighter 27 Finale
|
|align=center|2
|align=center|4:55
|Las Vegas, Nevada, United States
|
|-
|Win
|align=center|28–9
|Eric Spicely
|TKO (body kick)
|The Ultimate Fighter 26 Finale
|
|align=center|2
|align=center|2:18
|Las Vegas, Nevada, United States
|
|-
|Loss
|align=center|27–9
|Thiago Santos
|TKO (punches)
|UFC 213
|
|align=center|2
|align=center|2:04
|Las Vegas, Nevada, United States
|
|-
|Win
|align=center|27–8
|Ryan Janes
|Submission (armbar)
|UFC Fight Night: Lewis vs. Browne
|
|align=center|1
|align=center|1:34
|Halifax, Nova Scotia, Canada
|
|-
|Win
|align=center|26–8
|Joe Gigliotti
|Submission (anaconda choke)
|UFC Fight Night: Lewis vs. Abdurakhimov
|
|align=center|1
|align=center|4:12
|Albany, New York, United States
|
|-
| Win
| align=center| 25–8
| Chase Waldon
| Submission (arm-triangle choke)
| Resurrection Fighting Alliance
| 
| align=center| 1
| align=center| 1:44
| Prior Lake, Minnesota, United States
| 
|-
| Win
| align=center| 24–8
| Sidney Wheeler
| Submission (kimura)
| Valor Fights 36
| 
| align=center| 1
| align=center| 1:22
| Gatlinburg, Tennessee, United States
|
|-
| Win
| align=center| 23–8
| Lucas Rota
| TKO (doctor stoppage)
| Titan FC 34
| 
| align=center| 3
| align=center| 0:50
| Kansas City, Missouri, United States
| 
|-
| Win
| align=center| 22–8
| Keith Smetana
| TKO (punches)
| 4BC: Capital City Punishment
| 
| align=center| 1
| align=center| 1:51
| Bismarck, North Dakota, United States
| 
|-
| Win
| align=center|  21–8
| Matt Lagou
| Submission (arm-triangle choke)
| KOTC: Magnum Force
| 
| align=center| 1
| align=center| 1:26
| Carlton, Minnesota, United States
| 
|-
| Loss
| align=center| 20–8
| Sam Alvey
| Decision (unanimous)
| North American Fighting Championship
| 
| align=center| 3
| align=center| 5:00
| Milwaukee, Wisconsin, United States
| 
|-
| Win
| align=center| 20–7
| Eddie Larrea
| Submission (arm-triangle choke)
| North American Fighting Championship: Super Brawl 2
| 
| align=center| 2
| align=center| 1:05
| Milwaukee, Wisconsin, United States
|
|-
| Win
| align=center| 19–7
| Nathan Gunn
| Submission (guillotine choke)
| Canadian Fighting Championship 8
| 
| align=center| 2
| align=center| 2:00
| Winnipeg, Manitoba, Canada
| 
|-
| Win
| align=center| 18–7
| George Lockhart
| Decision (unanimous)
| National Fighting Championship 58
| 
| align=center| 3
| align=center| 5:00
| Duluth, Georgia, United States
| 
|-
| Win
| align=center| 17–7
| Jay Ellis
| TKO (punches)
| KOTC: Certified
| 
| align=center| 1
| align=center| 1:03
| Keshena, Wisconsin, United States
| 
|-
| Loss
| align=center| 16–7
| Anthony Lapsley
| Submission (rear-naked choke)
| Rocktagon MMA Elite Series 23
| 
| align=center| 1
| align=center| 1:15
| Cleveland, Ohio, United States
| 
|-
| Loss
| align=center| 16–6
| Sergej Juskevic
| Submission (kneebar)
| Score Fighting Series 6
| 
| align=center| 1
| align=center| 4:32
| Sarnia, Ontario, Canada
| 
|-
| Win
| align=center| 16–5
| Eddie Larrea
| Submission (rear-naked choke)
| Rogue Warrior Championships 3
| 
| align=center| 1
| align=center| 3:35
| Green Bay, Wisconsin, United States
|
|-
| Loss
| align=center| 15–5
| Herbert Goodman
| Submission (rear-naked choke)
| Combat USA: Wisconsin State Finals
| 
| align=center| 1
| align=center| 1:28
| Green Bay, Wisconsin, United States
| 
|-
| Win
| align=center| 15–4
| Dallas O'Malley
| Submission (guillotine choke)
| Combat USA 24
| 
| align=center| 2
| align=center| 0:38
| Green Bay, Wisconsin, United States
| 
|-
| Win
| align=center| 14–4
| Sam Alvey
| Submission (guillotine choke)
| Combat USA: Championship Tournament Finals
| 
| align=center| 5
| align=center| 4:08
| Green Bay, Wisconsin, United States
|
|-
| Win
| align=center| 13–4
| Ron Faircloth
| Submission (rear-naked choke)
| Madtown Throwdown Worlds Collide
| 
| align=center| 2
| align=center| 3:34
| Madison, Wisconsin, United States
| 
|-
| Win
| align=center| 12–4 
| Jim Klimczyk
| TKO (punches)
| Combat USA: 19
| 
| align=center| 1
| align=center| 2:56
| Wausau, Wisconsin, United States
| 
|-
| Win
| align=center| 11–4
| Eddie Larrea
| Submission (arm-triangle choke)
| Extreme Cagefighting Organisation 4
| 
| align=center| 2
| align=center| 0:52
| Wisconsin Dells, Wisconsin, United States
| 
|-
| Win
| align=center|  10–4  
| Morrison Lamb
| Submission (guillotine choke)
| Racine Fight Night 5
| 
| align=center| 1
| align=center| 1:02
| Racine, Wisconsin, United States
| 
|-
| Win
| align=center| 9–4   
| Jacob Kuester
| Submission (neck crank)
| Gladiators Cage Fighting: Fair Warning
| 
| align=center| 1
| align=center| 1:14
| Milwaukee, Wisconsin, United States
|
|-
|  Loss
| align=center| 8–4 
| Kenny Robertson
| Submission (kneebar)
|  Madtown Throwdown 19
| 
| align=center| 1
| align=center| 3:15
| Madison, Wisconsin, United States
| 
|-
| Loss
| align=center| 8–3 
| Curtis Bailey
| Submission (guillotine choke)
| Madtown Throwdown 17
| 
| align=center| 1
| align=center| 1:19
| Madison, Wisconsin, United States
|
|-
| Win
| align=center| 8–2 
| Mike Vaughn
| Submission (rear-naked choke)
| Madtown Throwdown 16
| 
| align=center| 2
| align=center| N/A
| Madison, Wisconsin, United States
|
|-
| Win
| align=center| 7–2  
| Ryan Scheeper
| Submission (armbar)
| Freestyle Combat Challenge 35
| 
| align=center| 1
| align=center| 0:40
| Racine, Wisconsin, United States
|
|-
| Win
| align=center| 6–2 
| Alex Carter
| Submission (triangle choke)
| Freestyle Combat Challenge 34
| 
| align=center| 2
| align=center| N/A
| Kenosha, Wisconsin, United States
|
|-
| Win
| align=center| 5–2
| Caleb Krull
| Decision (unanimous)
| Freestyle Combat Challenge 33
| 
| align=center| 3
| align=center| 3:00
| Kenosha, Wisconsin, United States
| 
|-
| Win
| align=center| 4–2
| Kenneth Allen
| Submission (triangle choke)
| Freestyle Combat Challenge 32
| 
| align=center| 1
| align=center| N/A
| Kenosha, Wisconsin, United States
| 
|-
| Loss
| align=center| 3–2
| Daisuke Hanazawa
| Submission (kimura)
| Freestyle Combat Challenge 29
| 
| align=center| 1
| align=center| N/A
| Racine, Wisconsin, United States
| 
|-
| Win
| align=center| 3–1
| Will Pace
| Submission (rear-naked choke)
| Freestyle Combat Challenge 28
| 
| align=center| 1
| align=center| N/A
| Racine, Wisconsin, United States
| 
|-
| Win
| align=center| 2–1
| Shane Kruchten
| TKO (punches)
| Freestyle Combat Challenge 27
| 
| align=center| 2
| align=center| N/A
| Waukegan, Illinois, United States
| 
|-
| Loss
| align=center| 1–1
| Jay Ellis
| Technical Submission (choke)
| Freestyle Combat Challenge 26
| 
| align=center| 1
| align=center| N/A
| Kenosha, Wisconsin, United States
| 
|-
| Win
| align=center| 1–0
| Fernando Gomez
| Submission (rear-naked choke)
| Freestyle Combat Challenge 25
| 
| align=center| 1
| align=center| N/A
| Kenosha, Wisconsin, United States
|
|-

See also
 List of current UFC fighters
 List of male mixed martial artists
 List of UFC bonus award recipients

References

External links
 

1987 births
Living people
American male mixed martial artists
Sportspeople from Racine, Wisconsin
Middleweight mixed martial artists
Mixed martial artists utilizing taekwondo
Mixed martial artists utilizing Brazilian jiu-jitsu
Mixed martial artists from Wisconsin
Sportspeople from Green Bay, Wisconsin
Ultimate Fighting Championship male fighters
American male taekwondo practitioners
American male kickboxers
American practitioners of Brazilian jiu-jitsu
People awarded a black belt in Brazilian jiu-jitsu